The 45th edition of the World Allround Speed Skating Championships for Women took place on 28 and 29 January 1984 in Deventer at the IJsselstadion ice rink.

Title holder was Andrea Schöne-Mitscherlich from East Germany.

Distance medalists

Classification

Source:

References

Attribution
In Dutch

1980s in speed skating
1980s in women's speed skating
1984 World Allround
1984 in women's speed skating